Fourth-seeded Darlene Hard defeated first-seeded Maria Bueno 6–4, 10–12, 6–4 in the final to win the women's singles tennis title at the 1960 U.S. National Championships. The tournament was played on outdoor grass courts and held from September 2 through September 17, 1960 at the West Side Tennis Club in Forest Hills, Queens, New York.

The draw consisted of 64 players of which eight were seeded.

Seeds
The seeded players are listed below. Darlene Hard is the champion; others show in brackets the round in which they were eliminated.

  Maria Bueno (finalist)
  Ann Haydon (quarterfinals)
  Christine Truman (semifinals)
  Darlene Hard  (champion) 
  Karen Hantze (third round)
  Jan Lehane (quarterfinals)
  Bernice Vukovich (quarterfinals)
  Nancy Richey (quarterfinals)

Draw

Key
 Q = Qualifier
 WC = Wild card
 LL = Lucky loser
 r = Retired

Final eight

References

1960
1960 in women's tennis
1960 in American women's sports
Wom
Women's sports in New York (state)
Women in New York City
1960 in sports in New York City
Forest Hills, Queens